Aucapata is a location in the La Paz Department in Bolivia. It is the seat of the Aucapata Municipality, the third municipal section of the Muñecas Province.

References 

 Instituto Nacional de Estadistica de Bolivia

Populated places in La Paz Department (Bolivia)